Johann Nordmann (born Rumpelmayer, also published as Johannes Nordmann and under the pseudonym H. Naudh, 13 March 1820 in Landersdorf, now Krems an der Donau – 20 August 1887 in Vienna) was an Austrian journalist and travel writer.

Life
Little is known about his life, as much of his work was published under pseudonyms. It is possible he was related to the Austrian-Hungarian architect Viktor Rumpelmayer (1830–1885).

Works
Nordmann's most enduring work is the poem/serenade "Kling leise, mein Lied" set by several composers including Franz Liszt in 1848.

It is unclear if Nordmann is the author behind the 1861 work "Jews and the German State," (Die Juden und der deutsche Staat) published under the pseudonym H. Naudh. The work was one of the few overtly anti-semitic works of the 1860s and was regarded as a classic in the genre. It went through twelve editions before 1820 and was adopted and revised by anti-semitic publisher Theodor Fritsch. Fritsch questioned Nordmann's authorship of the book, believing it to be written at the behest of or perhaps revised by Lothar Bucher, soon to become an aide to Otto von Bismarck and Hermann Wagener, a ranking member of the Prussian Conservative party. The work argued against Jewish emancipation.

 Carrara a historical novel from ancient Padua, Lepizig: Brockhaus, 1851
 Dante's Zeitalter (Dante's Times), a preliminary study to a comprehensive work about Dante, 1852
 Kling leise, mein Lied Serenade. Second edition, 1860
 "My Sundays" Travel journal from the Austrian high Alps, Vienna: 1868
 Unterwegs (On route) Continuation of the hiking book, "My Sundays" Berlin: Angel, 1884

Bibliography
 
 
 Leopold Schmidt, Die Entdeckung des Burgenlandes im Biedermeier. Studien zur Geistesgeschichte und Volkskunde Ostösterreichs im 19. Jahrhundert (- Johann Nordmann) Burgenländisches Landesmuseum, Eisenstadt 1959.
 Helmuth Furch, Historisches Lexikon Kaisersteinbruch. 2 Volumes. Museums- und Kulturverein, Kaisersteinbruch 2002–2004.

External links
 

1820 births
1887 deaths
People from Krems an der Donau
Austrian journalists
Austrian travel writers
19th-century journalists
Male journalists
19th-century male writers